Elimaea fallax is a species of katydid or bush cricket found in eastern China and Korea. It was originally described in 1951.

References

fallax
Orthoptera of Asia
Insects described in 1951